The A132 road is a road in England connecting Pitsea and South Woodham Ferrers.

Route description 
The A132 starts from a roundabout next to the A13 in Pitsea. From there, the route heads towards Basildon. After going through Basilton, the route heads northwards to an interchange with the A127. From the interchange, the route heads north-eastwards through Wickford to a partial cloverleaf interchange with the A130. From there, the route continues to head north-eastwards to a roundabout in South Woodham Ferrers.

References 

Roads in England
Roads in Essex